The Hager Building is an historic commercial building which is located in Lancaster, Lancaster County, Pennsylvania. Designed by noted Lancaster architect C. Emlen Urban, it was built between 1910 and 1911.

It was added to the National Register of Historic Places in 1979.

History and architectural featues
The Hager Building is a five-story, three-bay-by-five-bay, steel frame structure clad in terra cotta. It was designed in a French Renaissance Revival style. This section of the Hager Building measures sixty-three feet by one hundred and one feet. The overall dimensions of the building are two hundred forty feet, six inches, by sixty-three feet. This includes the central warehouse section, built between 1860 and 1890, and a brick northern extension that was built in 1923.

The building once housed the Hager Brothers Department Store.

It was added to the National Register of Historic Places in 1979.

References

External links
Master Builders of Lancaster: John Hausladen

Commercial buildings on the National Register of Historic Places in Pennsylvania
Romanesque Revival architecture in Pennsylvania
Commercial buildings completed in 1911
Buildings and structures in Lancaster, Pennsylvania
Department stores on the National Register of Historic Places
1911 establishments in Pennsylvania
National Register of Historic Places in Lancaster, Pennsylvania